Frederick the Fair or the Handsome (c. 1289 – 13 January 1330), from the House of Habsburg, was the duke of Austria and Styria from 1308 as well as the anti-king of Germany from 1314 until 1325 and then co-king until his death.

Background
Frederick was born in Vienna, the second son of King Albert I of Germany by his wife Elisabeth of Gorizia-Tyrol, a scion of the Meinhardiner dynasty, and thereby a grandson of the first Habsburg king of Germany Rudolph I.

Duke of Austria
Still a minor, he and his elder brother Rudolph III had been vested with the duchies of Austria and Styria by their father in 1298. Upon Rudolph's early death in 1307 and the assassination of his father in 1308, he became the ruler of the Austrian and Styrian duchies on behalf of himself and his younger brothers. The royal title held by his father and grandfather however passed to Count Henry VII of Luxembourg, who was elected by six of seven votes, contrived by the mighty Archchancellor Peter of Aspelt, elector and prince-archbishop of Mainz, a fierce opponent of late King Albert. Frederick had to abjure all claims to the German crown and in turn received the official affirmation of his fiefs by King Henry.

Originally, he was a friend of his cousin Louis IV of Bavaria, who also had been raised at the Austrian court in Vienna. However, armed conflict arose between them when tutelage over the young sons of Louis' cousin, late Duke Stephen I of Lower Bavaria was entrusted to Frederick by local nobles in 1313. Frederick took the occasion to enlarge his reach of power, invaded the Bavarian lands, but was beaten by Louis at the Battle of Gammelsdorf on 9 November 1313, and had to renounce the tutelage.

Double election of 1314
Meanwhile, Henry VII had been crowned emperor by Pope Clement V on 29 June 1312, but he died in the following year. As his son King John of Bohemia, seemed too powerful to the prince-electors, Frederick again became a candidate for the crown, while King John withdrew and backed Louis IV of Bavaria. On 19 October 1314 at Frankfurt-Sachsenhausen, Frederick received four out of seven votes, however two of them being contested, by Archbishop Henry II of Cologne, by Louis' brother Elector Palatine Rudolph I who did not want to support his younger brother, by the deposed Bohemian king Henry of Carinthia, and Duke Rudolph I of Saxe-Wittenberg (whose right was contested by his Lauenburg cousin, head of the senior branch). The next day however (because the Luxemburg party did not accept this election), a second election was held upon the instigation of Archbishop Peter von Aspelt, where Louis IV was elected with the five votes by the Mainz archbishop himself, by Archbishop Baldwin of Trier, Margrave Waldemar of Brandenburg as well as by Duke John II of Saxe-Lauenburg (he contested his Wittenberg cousin's claim to the electoral vote) and - again - the king of Bohemia, John. It is clear that at least three of the voters of Louis were uncontested electors.

Louis made use of the conflict around the Bohemian throne and the rivalry over the Saxon electoral dignity between the Ascanian duchies of Saxe-Wittenberg and Saxe-Lauenburg. Henry of Carinthia voting for Frederick actually only claimed the electoral power, as he had already been deposed in 1310 by John voting for Louis. Duke John II of Saxe-Lauenburg in turn sought to prevail against his cousin Duke Rudolph I of Saxe-Wittenberg - which ultimately failed as the 1338 Declaration of Rhense and the Golden Bull of 1356 conclusively named the dukes of Saxe-Wittenberg as electors.

Louis then was quickly crowned at Aachen Cathedral by Archbishop Peter von Aspelt, while Frederick was forced to proceed to Bonn Minster for his coronation on 25 November 1314 by the Cologne archbishop Heinrich von Virneburg. Both tried for the support by the Imperial States; Frederick was enfeebled by the fact that he had been crowned at the wrong place and moreover struggled with the rebellious Swiss Confederacy in the Swabian home territories of the Habsburgs, suffering a crushing defeat at the 1315 Battle of Morgarten. He nevertheless was able to hold his ground against the Wittelsbach rival and after several years of bloody war, victory finally seemed to be within Frederick's grasp, as he was strongly supported by the forces of his younger brother Leopold I. However, Frederick's army was in the end completely beaten near Mühldorf on Ampfing Heath on 28 September 1322, and Frederick and 1,300 nobles from Austria and the allied Archbishopric of Salzburg were captured.

Reconciliation
Louis held Frederick captive at Trausnitz Castle in the Upper Palatinate for three years, but the persistent resistance by Frederick's brother Leopold, the retreat of King John of Bohemia from his alliance and a ban by Pope John XXII induced Louis to release him under the Treaty of Trausnitz of 13 March 1325. In this agreement, Frederick finally recognized Louis as legitimate ruler and undertook to return to captivity if he did not succeed in convincing his younger brothers to submit to Louis. As he did not manage to overcome Leopold's obstinacy, Frederick returned to Munich as a prisoner, even though the Pope had released him from his oath. Impressed by Frederick's noble gesture, Louis renewed the old friendship with Frederick and they agreed to rule the Holy Roman Empire jointly. Since the Pope and the prince-electors strongly objected to this agreement, another treaty was signed at Ulm on 7 January 1326, according to which Frederick would govern Germany as king, while Louis would be crowned emperor by the "people of Rome" under Sciarra Colonna in 1328.

After Leopold's death in 1326, Frederick withdrew from ruling Germany and returned to rule only in Austria and Styria. He died on 13 January 1330, at Gutenstein Castle in the Wienerwald range, and was buried at Mauerbach Charterhouse, which he had founded. After the charterhouse was closed down in 1782, his remains were brought to the Ducal Crypt at St. Stephen's Cathedral in Vienna.

Frederick's gracious return to captivity inspired Friedrich Schiller to write his poem Deutsche Treue ("German Loyalty") and Uhland to his tragedy Ludwig der Bayer ("Louis the Bavarian").

Marriage and issue
On 11 May 1315 Frederick had married Isabella of Aragon, daughter of King James II of Aragon with Blanche of Anjou, an ambitious woman with an immense dowry. They had one son, who was born in 1316 but he died in 1322.

Their daughters:
 Elizabeth was born in 1317 and she died in 1336.
 Anna was born in 1318, and married the Wittelsbach duke Henry XV of Bavaria in 1328. The marriage was childless. Henry died in 1333. Her second husband was Count John Henry IV of Gorizia. This marriage was also childless and John died in 1338. Anne died in 1343.

Frederick was succeeded in Austria and Styria by his younger brothers Albert II and Otto. It took the Habsburgs more than a century to regain the royal crown, when Albert's II great-grandson Albert V of Austria ascended to the German throne in 1438.

References

External links
 

Frederick I of Austria (Habsburg)
Frederick I of Austria (Habsburg)
Year of birth uncertain
14th-century dukes of Austria
14th-century Kings of the Romans
Anti-kings
Dukes of Styria
Nobility from Vienna
Frederick 01
Burials at St. Stephen's Cathedral, Vienna
Royal reburials